Aqrabat  is a Syrian village located in Idlib Nahiyah in Idlib District, Idlib.  According to the Syria Central Bureau of Statistics (CBS), Aqrabat had a population of 1086 in the 2004 census.

References 

Populated places in Idlib District